Leif Björnlod (born 1939) is a Swedish Green Party politician, member of the Riksdag 2002–2006.

References

Members of the Riksdag from the Green Party
Living people
1939 births
Members of the Riksdag 2002–2006
21st-century Swedish politicians